Li Fengniang (1144 – 16 July 1200) was a Chinese empress consort of the Song Dynasty, married to Emperor Guangzong of Song. She is known as the de facto ruler of the Song dynasty Empire during the reign of her spouse.

Life
Empress Li was born as Fengniang, daughter of general Li Dao, a military commissioner from Anyang. According to legend, a Daoist priest and matchmaker one day predicted that she was destined to be the mother of the people. After having made the prediction, the priest asked for an audience with the emperor, and successfully negotiated for her to be accepted as consort of the emperor's grandson Zhao Dun, the future Emperor Guangzong.

As crown princess 
Li was accepted as the consort of Prince Dun, and became Crown Princess when her spouse was elevated to the position of heir to the throne in 1170. Crown Princess Li was described as dominant and independent minded. She complained of the concubines of her husband to the retired Emperor Gaozong as well as to her father-in-law Emperor Xiaozong who became displeased with her and asked her to act in a more submissive way, such as the Empress Dowager Wu. Li refused to submit, however, and there are several stories illustrating how she came to dominate her husband.

As empress consort 
In 1189, her spouse succeeded to the throne as Emperor Guangzong of Song. Empress Li Fengniang became notorious in Chinese history for being ruthless and shrewd, and for ruling the state through her husband, who became known a "henpecked weakling" dominated by his wife. During his reign, it was the Empress who de facto ruled the Song Empire. There is a legend to how this occurred. In 1191, Empress Li allegedly had the emperor's favorite concubine consort Huang killed, which caused the Emperor to react so badly that he became sick and bedridden, leaving the empress to handle the affairs of state by herself.  

Empress Li reportedly attempted to keep the emperor and his father separate, and often stopped the emperor from seeing his father. On one occasion, at the sickbed of the emperor, her father-in-law threatened to have her executed for not taking proper care of the monarch. When her spouse recovered, she told him about the threat, and also that she suspected that the medicine his father had left him was poisoned. This is given as the reason to why Emperor Guangzong did not visit his own father's funeral in 1194, which was blamed on Empress Li and led the Empress Dowager Wu to force Guangzong to abdicate.

As retired empress 

After the abdication of her spouse, she was called "The Empress of the Retired Emperor". In 1197, she caused a last scandal by refusing to attend the funeral of Empress Dowager Wu.

Notes

1144 births
1200 deaths
Song dynasty empresses
Song dynasty empresses dowager
12th-century Chinese women
12th-century Chinese people